Fernando Pessoa University (UFP; Portuguese: Universidade Fernando Pessoa) is a private university located in Porto and Ponte de Lima, Portugal. It was founded in 1996 and named after Fernando Pessoa, a Portuguese writer and poet.

Courses

1st Cycle Degrees

Porto 

 Faculty of Science and Technology (FCT)
 Civil Engineering
 Quality, Hygiene and Safety Engineering
 Environmental and Health Engineering
 Computer Engineering

 Faculty of Health Sciences (FCS)
 Clinical Analysis and Public Health
 Nutrition Sciences
 Nursing
 Physiotherapy
 Speech Therapy

 Faculty of Human and Social Sciences (FCHS)
 Communication Sciences
 Business Sciences
 Political Science and International Relations
 Cultural Studies
 Criminology
 Psychology
 Information and Documentation Sciences
 Social service

Integrated Master's Degrees 
 Architecture and Urbanism
 Dentistry
 Pharmaceutical Sciences

Ponte de Lima 
 Faculty of Health Sciences (FCS)
 Nursing
 Rehabilitation and Psychomotricity

 Faculty of Human and Social Sciences (FCHS)
 Business Management and Accounting

2nd Cycle Degrees 
Humanitarian Action, Cooperation and Development
Specialized Laboratory Analyzes
Communication Sciences
Educational Sciences: Special Education
Business Sciences
Criminology
Civil Engineering
Computer Engineering
Physiotherapy
Clinical and Health Psychology
Psychology of Justice: Victims of Violence and Crime

3rd Cycle Degrees 
Information Sciences
Earth Sciences
Language Development and Disturbances
Ecology and Environmental Health

Investigation and development 

The Fernando Pessoa University currently has 14 research centers, which makes it one of the most advanced private universities in Portugal in this field , being:

Bioengineering and Pharmacological Center (CBFC)
Center for Latin American Studies (CELA)
Center for Communication Studies (CEC)
Center for the Study of Minorities (CENMIN)
Center for Applied Anthropology Studies (CEAA)
Center for Trends in Hospitality and Tourism Studies (CETS-HT)
Center for Studies and Multimedia Resources (CEREM)
Center for Studies in Psychology (CEPSI)
Center for Studies on Computer Text and Cyberliterature (CETIC)
Center for Tax and Administration Studies (CETA)
Center for Modeling and Analysis of Environmental Systems (CEMAS)
Transdisciplinary Center for Consciousness Studies (CTEC)
Laboratory of Studies and Projects (LEP)
Facial Expression Laboratory of Emotion (FEELab)
Biomedical Systems and Sensors Group (SiSeBi)

See also 
List of universities in Portugal
Higher education in Portugal

External links
 Official site
 

Universities in Portugal
1996 establishments in Portugal
Education in Porto
Private universities and colleges in Portugal
Educational institutions established in 1996